Legislative elections were held in Argentina on 27 October 2013. Open primary elections (PASO) were previously held on 11 August 2013 to determine eligible party lists for the general election. As in 2011 – when such primaries were held for the first time – each party list had to reach a 1.5% threshold at the provincial level in order to proceed to the 27 October polls.

The elections renewed half of the members of the Chamber of Deputies for the period 2013–2017 and a third of the members of the Senate for the period 2013–2019. Chamber of Deputies (Lower House) elections were held in every district; Senate elections were, in turn, held in the provinces of Chaco, Entre Ríos, Neuquén, Río Negro, Salta, Santiago del Estero, and Tierra del Fuego, as well as in the City of Buenos Aires. Corrientes Province held the only elections for governor in 2013, doing so on 15 September.

These elections included two significant novelties. Following the enactment of a law to that effect in 2012, voluntary suffrage was extended to voters age 16 and 17, which increased eligible voters by 4.5% or about 1.2 million; of this total, approximately 600,000 registered to vote. Argentine voters in 2013 also parted with the traditional election-day seal stamped on National Identity Documents (DNI) by election officials, receiving instead a ballot stub with a bar code and serial number.

Background 
President Cristina Fernández de Kirchner was reelected in 2011, and the Kirchnerist Front for Victory (FpV) rode her coattails in gubernatorial and congressional races alike. Following the elections, however, foreign exchange controls, austerity measures, persistent inflation, and downturns in Brazil, Europe, and other important trade partners, resulted in a sudden downturn and a consequent erosion of the president's popularity. A series of cacerolazos organized by opponents of the government took place during 2012 and 2013 (13S, 8N, 18A, and 8A).

The recession was shorter and shallower than much of the local media had predicted, however; and while the FpV entered the 2013 campaign season with sounder footing on pocketbook issues, they were dogged by ongoing speculation that its caucus sought a two-thirds majority in the Lower House with the goal of amending the Constitution to allow the president to seek a third term. A survey conducted in June 2013 by the consulting firm CEIS gave the Front for Victory (the majority party in Congress, as well as the party in power since 2003) 30.3% in the City of Buenos Aires and 39.7% in the Province of Buenos Aires (the largest electoral district). The right-wing PRO polled at 23.4% and 16.7%, respectively; the Federal Peronists and other PJ party lists opposed to Kirchnerism, 10.3% and 16.7%; the centrist Civic Coalition, 9.2% and 5.0%; and the center-left UCR, 7.4% and 8.0%.

The FpV, moreover, had the advantage of having relatively few Lower House seats at stake in 2013. Congressmen in Argentina serve four-year terms, and gains for the various opposition parties in 2009 meant that 2013 put a disproportionate number of their Lower House seats at stake: while the FpV contested 38 of its 116 Lower House seats, a full 76 of 118 opposition seats were at stake this year (a further 13 seats of the 23 belonging to minor parties allied with the FpV were at stake).

Primaries

The PASO primaries were held on Sunday, 11 August, amid high turnout consistent with recent past elections and estimated by Interior Minister Florencio Randazzo at over 70%.

The Province of Buenos Aires, the largest electoral district and home to 3 out of 8 Argentines, dominated campaign news much as it has in every mid-term election in recent years. As the party list filing deadline on 22 June drew near, the spotlight focused on the popular mayor of Tigre, Sergio Massa. Massa had been elected mayor on the FpV slate, and had served in a number of high-ranking posts in the administrations of both Cristina Kirchner and her predecessor and husband, the late Néstor Kirchner. His relationship with the Kirchners had been a difficult one, however, and though polling gave him better prospects running for Congress under the FpV party list than on a separate slate, Massa ultimately opted to form his own Frente Renovador (Renewal Front) ticket with the support of the 'Group of 8' Buenos Aires Province Mayors and others, notably former Argentine Industrial Union president José Ignacio de Mendiguren (an ally of Kirchnerism).

Massa's decision to run as an opponent deprived the FpV of a key ally and he moved quickly to consolidate the center-right vote in Buenos Aires Province by obtaining the endorsement of the PRO (which ran on the Renewal Front list headed by Massa rather than on its own). Federal Peronist Congressman Francisco de Narváez, who would be in direct competition with the Renewal Front for the province's large center-right Peronist vote, believed that the charismatic Massa was in reality a "trojan horse" for the FpV; Renewal Front congressmen, per his reasoning, would run against Kirchnerism only to vote with them once elected to Congress. The Renewal Front, in any case, ultimately defeated the FpV list headed by Lomas de Zamora Mayor Martín Insaurralde by about 35% to 30%, with the Progressive, Civic and Social Front (FPCyS) list headed by Congressmen Margarita Stolbizer and Ricardo Alfonsín and Congressman de Narváez's Front for Union and Work list receiving about 11% each; were this result to be mirrored in October, de Narváez would lose four of eight congressmen he led in 2009 on the successful Unión/PRO list.

The centrist Civic Coalition ARI, for its part, arguably achieved its most significant political victory in four years when Congressman Alfonso Prat-Gay forged the Civic Coalition-led Juntos UNEN (Together They Unite) alliance with UCR Congressional caucus leader Ricardo Gil Lavedra, leftist Proyecto Sur leader Pino Solanas, former Civic Coalition head Elisa Carrió (who left the CC in 2012 following a poor showing in the 2011 presidential race), and Victoria Donda of the leftist Freemen of the South Movement in January 2013. Prat-Gay was nominated as the lead UNEN candidate for a seat in the Argentine Senate for the City of Buenos Aires (where the alliance was strongest), and Gil Lavedra the lead UNEN candidate for the Lower House; former Economy Minister Martín Lousteau (who fell out with President Fernández de Kirchner after his 2008 dismissal) joined Gil Lavedra and Carrió on the UNEN Lower House list for the city.

The City of Buenos Aires, ruled since 2007 by a PRO mayor, handed the rightist PRO an upset by giving UNEN standard-bearers Prat-Gay and Solanas the two Senate seats (out of three) accorded to the winning list in each district, edging out former Vice-Mayor Gabriela Michetti (who would obtain the third seat) and current City Environment Minister Diego Santilli, and costing FpV Senator Daniel Filmus his own seat. The PRO party list for the city's delegation to the Lower House, headed by Rabbi Sergio Bergman (a member of the Buenos Aires City Legislature) and Bank of the City of Buenos Aires director Federico Sturzenegger, was likewise defeated by the UNEN list headed by Congressmen Gil Lavedra and Carrió. The FpV list led by Legislator Juan Cabandié, came in third.

Córdoba Province, where Governor José Manuel de la Sota broke with the president after being elected with her endorsement, is where the acrimony between these Peronist factions was probably most acute. De la Sota fielded former Governor Juan Schiaretti as the head of his Lower House party list. Their Union for Córdoba list bested the UCR list headed by Congressman Oscar Aguad, the PRO list headed by former football referee Héctor Baldassi, the FpV list headed by former National University of Córdoba rector Carina Scotto, and the "It's Possible" list headed by former Economy Minister Domingo Cavallo with the support of neighboring San Luis Province Senator Alberto Rodríguez Saá (a Federal Peronist). Cavallo, who ran as a conservative and lost much of his political base as economy minister during the 2001 crisis, failed to reach the requisite 1.5% threshold to advance to the 27 October general election.

Santa Fe Province voted in the PASO election amid mourning for the 15 or more fatal victims claimed by the Rosario gas explosion on 6 August. Voters there gave the Progressive, Civic and Social Front list headed by former Governor Hermes Binner a victory over the PRO list headed by comedian Miguel del Sel and the FpV list headed by former Governor Jorge Obeid; the Socialist Party, to which Binner and the current governor, Antonio Bonfatti, belongs, is strongest in this province.

Mendoza Province gave the UCR list headed by former Governor and Vice President Julio Cobos a victory over the FpV list headed by Guaymallén Department Mayor Alejandro Abraham. Cobos is probably best remembered for his surprise, tie-breaking vote in 2008 against a bill raising oilseed export taxes; though not an oilseed-producing province, conservative politics have historically been strong in Mendoza, and Cobos' unexpected axing of the measure was widely supported in his province.

The PASO primaries thus gave congressional candidates on the Front for Victory (FpV) list a much reduced share of the popular vote (around 30%, compared to 57% in 2011), and the FpV led in only 10 of 23 provinces. They retained a plurality of the vote, however, and by virtue of having only 37 Lower House seats at stake, will likely increase their parliamentary majority by two. The UCR and FPCyS together totaled around 24%, with the latter likely losing around 5 seats due to the large number of seats at stake. The FpV fared better in most Senate races, losing only in the City of Buenos Aires while winning in Chaco, Entre Ríos, Río Negro, Salta, Santiago del Estero, and Tierra del Fuego Provinces; like in the Lower House races, their popular vote for Senate races fell sharply (from 54% to 34%), but their 8% advantage over the UCR and FPCyS combined and their improved showing in Tierra del Fuego compensated their loss of support elsewhere. The Neuquén People's Movement that has dominated politics in Neuquén Province since the 1960s and caucuses with the FpV in Congress, won in a landslide.

Senate

|-
! style="background-color:#E9E9E9;text-align:left;" colspan="2"|Parties
! style="background-color:#E9E9E9;text-align:right;" |Votes
! style="background-color:#E9E9E9;text-align:right;" |%
|-
|style="width: 10px; background-color:;" |
| style="text-align:left;" |Kirchnerists and allies
| style="text-align:right;" |1,746,625
| style="text-align:right;" |33.96
|-
|style="width: 10px; background-color:;" |
| style="text-align:left;" |Radical Civic Union (UCR), Socialist Party and allies
| style="text-align:right;" |1,356,419
| style="text-align:right;" |26.37
|-
|style="width: 10px; background-color:#FFEF00;" |
| style="text-align:left;" |Republican Proposal (PRO) and allies
| style="text-align:right;" |779,404
| style="text-align:right;" |15.16
|-
|style="width: 10px; background-color:#808080;" |
| style="text-align:left;" |Others (incl. Neuquén People's Movement)
| style="text-align:right;" |494,924
| style="text-align:right;" |9.62
|-
|style="width: 10px; background-color:#F65058;" |
| style="text-align:left;" |Left-wing (incl. Workers' Party)
| style="text-align:right;" |320,208
| style="text-align:right;" |6.23
|-
|style="width: 10px; background-color:#191970;" |
| style="text-align:left;" |Dissident Peronists
| style="text-align:right;" |213,676
| style="text-align:right;" |4.15
|-
|style="width: 10px; background-color:#FFFFFF;" |
| style="text-align:left;" |Against all
| style="text-align:right;" |
| style="text-align:right;" |
|-
|style="background-color:#E9E9E9;text-align:left;vertical-align:top;" colspan="2"|Total valid votes 
|width="75" style="text-align:right;background-color:#E9E9E9"|
|width="30" style="text-align:right;background-color:#E9E9E9"|100.00
|-
| style="text-align:left;vertical-align:top;" colspan="2"|Invalid votes
| style="vertical-align:top;" |
| style="vertical-align:top;" colspan="2" rowspan="3"|
|-
| style="text-align:left;vertical-align:top;" colspan="2"|Total votes cast
| style="vertical-align:top;" |
|-
| style="text-align:left;vertical-align:top;" colspan="2"|Registered voters
| style="vertical-align:top;" |
|-

Chamber of Deputies

|-
! style="background-color:#E9E9E9;text-align:left;" colspan="2"|Parties
! style="background-color:#E9E9E9;text-align:right;" |Votes
! style="background-color:#E9E9E9;text-align:right;" |%
|-
|style="width: 10px; background-color:;" |
| style="text-align:left;" |Kirchnerists and allies
| style="text-align:right;" |6,799,793
| style="text-align:right;" |29.65
|-
|style="width: 10px; background-color:#191970;" |
| style="text-align:left;" |Dissident Peronists (incl. Renewal Front)
| style="text-align:right;" |5,903,016
| style="text-align:right;" |25.74
|-
|style="width: 10px; background-color:;" |
| style="text-align:left;" |Radical Civic Union (UCR), Socialist Party and allies
| style="text-align:right;" |5,460,861
| style="text-align:right;" |23.81
|-
|style="width: 10px; background-color:#FFEF00;" |
| style="text-align:left;" |Republican Proposal (PRO) and allies
| style="text-align:right;" |1.525.995
| style="text-align:right;" |6.65
|-
|style="width: 10px; background-color:#F65058;" |
| style="text-align:left;" |Left-wing (Workers' Left Front, Self-determination and Freedom etc.)
| style="text-align:right;" |1,243,252
| style="text-align:right;" |5.42
|-
|style="width: 10px; background-color:#808080;" |
| style="text-align:left;" |Others (incl. Neuquén People's Movement)
| style="text-align:right;" |802,019
| style="text-align:right;" |3.5
|-
|style="width: 10px; background-color:#FFFFFF;" |
| style="text-align:left;" |Against all
| style="text-align:right;" |
| style="text-align:right;" |
|-
|style="background-color:#E9E9E9;text-align:left;vertical-align:top;" colspan="2"|Total valid votes 
|width="75" style="text-align:right;background-color:#E9E9E9"|
|width="30" style="text-align:right;background-color:#E9E9E9"|100.00
|-
| style="text-align:left;vertical-align:top;" colspan="2"|Invalid votes
| style="vertical-align:top;" |
| style="vertical-align:top;" colspan="2" rowspan="3"|
|-
| style="text-align:left;vertical-align:top;" colspan="2"|Total votes cast
| style="vertical-align:top;" |
|-
| style="text-align:left;vertical-align:top;" colspan="2"|Registered voters
| style="vertical-align:top;" |
|-

Results
The second and final round, held on 27 October, closely mirrored the 11 August results. The Renewal Front (center/center-right Peronists) received a plurality of votes in Buenos Aires Province (the nation's largest), while the Front for Victory (left-wing Peronists) and allies maintained their majority in both houses of Congress with minimal changes in the party composition of either chamber. Turnout was high, and was estimated to have reached 76%.

Cristina Fernández de Kirchner, serving a second presidency, is constitutionally barred from standing in the 2015 election, and the Front for Victory lacks the special two-thirds majority needed for a constitutional amendment. The support for Front for Victory dropped from 54% in 2011 to 33% in 2013. The government faces increasing popular discontent, and the vice-president Amado Boudou (currently acting as president while Fernández de Kirchner recuperates after surgery) is under investigation for the so-called Boudougate. Analysts for the BBC consider the poll results suggest Sergio Massa, Mauricio Macri and Daniel Scioli are likely candidates for the presidency in 2015.

Chamber of Deputies

Results by province

Senate

Results by province

References

External links

 Elecciones 2013  - Official site, run by the Interior ministry of Argentina

2013 elections in Argentina
2013
October 2013 events in South America